This is an incomplete list of burials at Kensal Green Cemetery by occupation.

Architects

 Thomas Allom (1804–1872)
 David Brandon (1813–1897)
 William Burn (1789–1870)
 Decimus Burton (1800–1881)
 John Murray Easton (1889–1975)
 John Gibson (1817–1892)
 John Goldicutt (1793–1842)
 Joseph Henry Good (1775–1857)
 Francis Goodwin (1784–1835)
 Charles Ridson Gribble (1835–1896)
 Philip Hardwick (1792–1880)
 Philip Charles Hardwick (1822–1892)
 Owen Jones (1809–1874)
 John Kelk (1816–1886)
 Henry Edward Kendall (1776–1875)
 Thomas Hayter Lewis (1818–1898)
 Alexander Marshall Peebles (1837–1891)
 William Scamp (1801–1872)
 John Shaw, Jr. (1803–1870)
 John Tarring (1805–1875)
 William Wood Deane (1825–1873)

Art

 Lady Laura Theresa Alma-Tadema (1852–1909)
 Jonathon St. John Aubin (1928–1986)
 Gaetano Stefano Bartolozzi (1757–1821)
 William Behnes (1795–1864)
 Richard Parkes Bonington (1802–1828)
 Henry Alexander Bowler (1824–1903)
 George Price Boyce (1826–1897)
 Thomas Brigstocke (1809–1881)
 Augustus Wall Callcott (1779–1844)
 Philip Hermogenes Calderon (1833–1898)
 Thomas Campbell (1790–1858)
 John Edward Carew (1785–1868)
 Hugh Carter (1837–1903)
 Sir Caspar Purdon Clarke (1846–1911)
 Ann Birch Cockings (c. 1766–1844)
 George Vicat Cole (1833–1893)
 Ernest Crofts (1847–1911)
 Eyre Crowe (1824–1910)
 George Cruikshank (1792–1878) (remains transferred to St. Paul's Cathedral in 1878)
 Allan Cunningham (1784–1842)
 Thomas Daniell (1749–1840)
 William Daniell (1769–1837)
 John Scarlett Davis (1804–1844)
 Lowes Cato Dickinson (1819–1908)
 Joseph Durham (1814–1877)
 Rev. Alexander Dyce (1798–1869)
 Sir Charles Lock Eastlake (1793–1865)
 Charles Locke Eastlake (1836–1906)
 Henri Jean-Baptiste Victoire Fradelle (1778–1865)
 William Powell Frith (1819–1909)
 Andrew Geddes (1783–1844)
 Carlo Giuliano (c. 1831–1895)
 Frederick Goulding (1842–1909)
 Fairlie Harmer (Lady Harberton) (1876–1945)
 Edwin Hayes (1819–1904)
 John Hollins (1798–1855)
 James Holworthy (c. 1796–1841)
 Humphrey Hopper (1833–1866)
 John Calcott Horsley (1817–1903)
 John Adams Houston (1812–1864)
 Anna Brownell Jameson (1794–1860)
 Frederick William Keyl (1823–1871)
 John Leech (1817–1864)
 Charles Robert Leslie (1794–1859)
 John Graham Lough (1806–1876)
 John Lucas (1807–1874)
 Daniel Maclise (1806–1870)
 William Calder Marshall (1813–1894)
 Wallis McKay (1802–1907)
 Phillipp Moos (c. 1779–1916)
 William Mulready (1776–1863)
 John Trivett Nettleship (1841–1902)
 John Phillip (1817–1867)
 Robert Phillips (1810–1881)
 Edward Gustavus Physick (1802–1875)
 Ada Alice Pullen (Dorothy Dene) (1859–1899)
 François Théodore Rochard (c. 1804–1857), younger brother of Simon Jacques Rochard
 William Salter (1804–1875)
 Edward Scriven (1775–1841)
 Robert William Sievier (1794–1865)
 François Simonau (1783–1859)]
 Robert Smirke (1752–1845)
 Emma Soyer (1813–1842)
 Thomas Stewardson (1781–1859)
 William Strang (1859–1921)
 Frederick Edward Swain (1871–1944)
 Sir John Tenniel (1820–1914)
 John Ternouth (c. 1796–1848)
 Joseph Theakston (1772–1842)
 John Thompson (1785–1866)
 Charles Vacher (1818–1883)
 John Varley (1778–1842)
 James Ward (1769–1859)
 Leslie Ward ('Spy') (1851–1922)
 John William Waterhouse (1849–1917)
 Henry Weekes (1807–1877)
 Gustavus George Zerffi (1821–1892)

Business

 Joshua Bates (1788–1864)
 Archibald Blane (1788–1852)
 John Lewis Bonhote (c. 1805–1867)
 Sir Ernest Joseph Cassel (1852–1921)
 Thomas de la Rue (1793–1866)
 Thomas Liversedge Fish (1782–1861)
 Sir Francis Freeling (1764–1836)
 John Gordon (1802–1840)
 Carl Joachim Hambro, 1st Baron Hambro (1807–1877)
 Thomas Hamlet (1770–1853)
 Sir Henry Harben (1823–1911)
 John Frederick Andrew Huth (1777–1864)
 Sir Andrew Lusk (1810–1909)
 Arnaud Paige Whyte (1815–1897)
 John Horsley Palmer (1779–1858) Governor of the Bank of England
 Sir John Dean Paul, 1st Baronet (1775–1852)
 Sir John Dean Paul, 2nd Baronet (1802–1868)
 Andrew Pears (1766–1845), inventor of Pears Soap
 Philip Cadell Peebles (1842–1895)
 Frederick Perkins (1780–1860)
 George Henry Robins (1778–1847)
 James Smith (died 1910)
 William Henry Smith (1792–1865)
 Joseph Charles Taylor, gave his name to Taylor's Port (died 1837)
 Gottlieb Augustus Treyer (1790–1869)
 Henry St George Tucker (1771–1851)
 John Aldred Twining (1770–1855)
 Richard Twining (1772–1857), FRS
 William Whiteley (1831–1907)

Circuses

 William Batty (1802–1863)
 Charles Blondin (Jean-Francois Gravelet) (1824–1897)
 Alfred Cooke (1822–1854)
 Thomas Taplin Cooke (c. 1782–1866)
 William Cooke (1808–1886)
 Andrew Ducrow (1793–1842)
 Jean Pierre Ginnett (died 1861)

Engineering

 Sir William Patrick Andrew (1806–1887)
 James Lloyd Ashbury (1834–1895)
 John Ashbury (1806–1866)
 Peter William Barlow (1809–1885)
 James Beatty (1820–1856)
 Richard Vicars Boyle (1822–1908)
 John Braithwaite (1797–1870)
 Peter Brotherhood (1838–1902)
 William Duff Bruce (1839–1900)
 Isambard Kingdom Brunel (1806–1859)
 Sir Marc Isambard Brunel (1769–1849)
 George Bowden Burnell (1814–1868)
 George Burt (1816–1894)
 James Combe (c. 1806–1867)
 Thomas Russell Crampton (1816–1888)
 Thomas Barnabas Daft (1816–1878)
 James Dredge (1840–1906)
 John Edward Errington (1806–1862)
 Francis Giles (1787–1847)
 William Thomas Henley (1813–1882)
 Charles William Lancaster (1820–1878)
 Michael Lane (c. 1803–1868)
 William Leftwich (1770–1843)
 Joseph Locke (1805–1860)
 James MacAdam (c. 1818–1853)
 Sir James Nichol MacAdam (1786–1852)
 Joseph Manton (1766–1835)
 John Robinson McClean (1813–1873)
 David Napier (1790–1869)
 Charles Oldfield (1794–1855)
 Angier March Perkins (1799–1881)
 Jacob Perkins (1766–1849)
 John Shae Perring (1813–1869)
 Benjamin Piercy (1827–1888)
 William Alexander Provis (1792–1870)
 James Meadows Rendel (1799–1856)
 John Rennie the younger (1794–1874)
 Richard Roberts (1789–1864)
 Joseph D'Aguilar Samuda (1813–1885)
 Sir Carl William Siemens FRS (1823–1883)
 Jacob Snider (died 1866)
 Charles Pelham Villiers (1802–1898)
 Frederick Albert Winsor (1763–1830)

Explorers

 Lady Jane Franklin (1791–1875)
 Admiral Sir Edward Augustus Inglefield (1820–1894)
 John Lander (1807–1839)
 Admiral Richard Charles Mayne (1835–1892)
 Vice Admiral Sir Robert McClure (1807–1873)
 Robert McCormick (1800–1890)
 Admiral Sir John Ross (1777–1856)
 Admiral Henry John Rous (1795–1877)
 John McDouall Stuart (1815–1866)

Funerals

 William Banting (1826–1901)
 William Westbrook Banting (1857–1932)
 Rupert Brindley (c. 1791–1847)
 Thomas Dowbiggin (died 1854)
 William Holland (1779–1856)
 Edward Manuel Lander (1836–1910)
 Richard Maile (died 1850)
 John Nodes (died 1895)

Legal

 Thomas James Arnold (c. 1804–1877)
 George Parker Bidder, Jr. (1836–1896)
 Peter Burrowes (1751–1841)
 George Frederick Carden (1798–1874)
 Richard Carlile (1790–1843)
 Sir Alexander Cockburn (1802–1880)
 Sir Cresswell Cresswell (1794–1863)
 Dadoba Dewajee (died 1861) [often given as "Daboda"]
 Sir George Farrant (c. 1770–1844)
 Sir Henry Hawkins (Baron Brampton) (1817–1907)
 Sir Henry Singer Keating (1804–1888)
 Sir Robert Lush (1807–1881)
 Sir Henry Manisty (1808–1890)
 Sir William Maule KC (1788–1858)
 Sir Richard Mayne KCB (1786–1868)
 Edward Molyneux (1798–1864)
 Robert Pashley (1805–1859)
 Samuel Plank (1777–1840)
 Sir George Rose FRS (1782–1873)
 Benjamin Rotch (1794–1854)
 James Russell (1790–1861)
 Sir Edward Ryan FRS (1793–1875)
 Charles Shaw-Lefevre, 1st Viscount Eversley (1794–1888)
 Edward Smirke (1795–1875)
 Sir Montague Edward Smith (1808–1891)
 Sir James Fitzjames Stephen (1829–1894)
 Nicholas Conyngham Tindal (1776–1846)

Medicine

 Dr. James Miranda Barry (1795–1865)
 Archibald Billing (1791–1881)
 John Bostock (1773–1846)
 Richard Bright (1789–1858)
 William Brinton (1823–1867)
 Sir Anthony Carlisle (1768–1840)
 Soorjo Coomar Goodeve Chuckerbutty (1826–1874)
 Richard Clewin Griffith (1791–1881)
 Dr. Albert Isaiah Coffin (1791–1866), Medical Botanist
 Robert Collum (1806–1900),
 Samuel Cooper (1780–1848)
 William Coulson (1802–1877)
 John Croft (1833–1905)
 George Darling (c. 1782–1862) 
 Robert Druitt (1814–1883)
 Sir George Duncan Gibb (1821–1876), Canadian doctor
 John Elliotson (1791–1868)
 George Napoleon Epps (1815–1874)
 John Epps (1805–1869)
 Arthur Farre (1811–1887)
 Sir John William Fisher (1788–1876)
 Samuel Jones Gee (1839–1911)
 Dr. James Manby Gully (1808–1883)
 Leonard Guthrie (1858–1918)
 Charles Robert Bell Keetley (1848–1909)
 Sir William Knighton (1776–1836)
 Robert Lee (1793–1877)
 Sir George William Lefevre (1798–1846)
 Sir Charles Locock (1799–1875)
 John St. John Long (1798–1834)
 James Luke (1799–1881)
 Sir William MacCormac (1836–1901)
 Sir James Ranald Martin (1793–1874)
 Sir James McGrigor (1771–1858)
 Sir William McKenzie (1811–1895)
 James Morison (1770–1840)
 Sir James Mouat (1815–1899)
 George Pilcher (1801–1855)
 Dr. Frederic Hervey Foster Quin (1799–1878)
 Edward Rigby (1804–1860)
 Frederick Salmon (1795–1868), founder of St Mark's Hospital
 Sir Charles Scudamore (1779–1849)
 Edward Cator Seaton (1815–1880)
 Robert Bentley Todd (1809–1860)
 Rear Admiral Henry Dundas Trotter (1802–1859)
 Dr. David Uwins (c. 1780–1837)
 Robert Wade (1798–1872)

Military

 Col. Frederick Robinson Aikman VC (1828–1888)
 Gen. Sir Richard Airey (1803–1881)
 Gen. Sir John Aitchison GCB (1789–1875)
 Gen. George Anson (1797–1857)
 Sir William Beatty FRS MD (1773–1842)
 Sir George Bell KCB (1794–1877)
 Sir Henry John William Bentinck (1796–1878)
 Gen. Sir Michael Anthony Shrapnel Biddulph (1823–1904)
 Col. Guy Huddlesdon Boisragon VC (1864–1931)
 Gen. Sir William Casement (1780–1844)
 Gen. Christopher Tilson Chowne (c. 1771–1834)
 Adm. Sir George Cockburn, Bt GCB (1772–1853)
 Gen. Sir Charles Colville (1770–1843)
 Sir Alexander Cunningham KCIE (1814–1893)
 Admiral Henry Collins Deacon (1788–1869)
 Gen. Sir Collingwood Dickson VC (1817–1904)
 Gen. Sir Moore Disney KCB (1766–1846)
 Matthew Charles Dixon (1821–1905)
 Charles Milne Cholmeley Dowling (died 1920)
 James Ekin (1829–1896)
 General Robert Ellice (1784–1856)
 General Sir George de Lacy Evans GCB (1787–1870)
 Vice Adml. Charles Joseph Frederick Ewart CB (1816–1884)
 Admiral Sir Arthur Fanshawe (1794–1864)
 Sir Ronald Crauford Ferguson (1773–1841)
 Sir Archibald Galloway KCB (died 1850)
 Gen. Isaac Gascoyne (1770–1841)
 Gen. Sir Walter Raleigh Gilbert, Bt GCB (1785–1853)
 Surgeon-General Huntly George Gordon (1821–1888)
 Lt. Col. Gideon Gorrequer (c. 1780–1841)
 Gen. Sir Hugh Henry Gough VC (1833–1899)
 Gen. Sir Lewis Grant (1778–1852)
 Admiral Sir Edward Hamilton KCB (1772–1851)
 Sir George Head (1782–1855)
 Major Gen. Sir John Hills FRS KCB (1832–1902)
 Capt. Neville Reginald Howse VC (1863–1930)
 Leonard Henry Lloyd Irby (1836–1905)
 Sir James Kempt GCB GCH (1776–1854)
 György Kmety (Ismail Pasha) (1813–1869)
 Major Gen. Sir Owen Edward Pennefeather Lloyd VC (1854–1941)
 Maj. Gen. David Limond (1831–1895)
 Gen. Sir William Lumley (1769–1850)
 Gen. Sir James Law Lushington (1779–1859)
 Lt. John Grant Malcolmson VC (1835–1902)
 Admiral Sir Thomas Byam Martin (1773–1854)
 Gen. Sir George Murray KCB (1772–1846)
 Vice Admiral James Noble (1779–1851)
 Admiral Sir Robert Walter Otway Bt (1770–1846)
 Sir Charles William Pasley (1780–1861)
 Gen. Sir George Paty KCB KH (1788–1868)
 Gen. Sir Marmaduke Warner Peacocke KG (1766–1849)
 Sir Henry Prescott GCB (1783–1874)
 Gen. Sir Dighton MacNaughton Probyn VC (1833–1924)
 Captain Charles Spencer Ricketts (1788–1867)
 Sir Robert Spencer Robinson (1809–1889)
 Sir Charles Rowan KCB (1783–1852)
 Admiral Sir Richard Edward Tracey (1837–1907)
 Gen. Sir Walter Tremenheere KH (1761–1855)
 Major Gen. William Spottiswoode Trevor VC (1831–1907)
 Major-Gen. Marcus Antonius Waters (1794–1868)
 Capt. George Alexander Waters (1818–1903)
 Lt-Col. Sir Henry Vassall Webster (1792–1847)
 Field Marshal Sir Alexander Woodford GCB GCMG (1782–1870)
 Gen. Edward Buckley Wynyard, CB (1788–1864)

Music

 Thomas Massa Alsager (1779–1846)
 William Ayrton (1777–1858)
 Michael William Balfe (1808–1870)
 Julius Benedict (1804–1885)
 James Chapman Bishop (1783–1854)
 George Augustus Polgreen Bridgetower (1782–1860)
 John Leman Brownsmith (1809–1866)
 Pete Burns (1959–2016)
 William Chappell (1809–1888)
 John Balsir Chatterton (1804–1871)
 Charles Lukey Collard (died 1891), piano manufacturer
 Thomas Simpson Cooke (1782–1848)
 Charles Coote (1807–1879), composer
 Sir Michael Andrew Agnellus Costa (1808–1884)
 Sir William George Cusins (1833–1893)
 Charles D'Albert (1809–1886), composer
 "Boots" (Philimore Gordon) Davidson (c. 1928–1993)
 Angelo Adolpho Ferrari (1807–1870)
 Henry John Gauntlett (1805–1876)
 Sir John Goss (1800–1880)
 John Liptrot Hatton (1809–1886)
 William Horsley (1774–1858)
 John Pyke Hullah (1812–1884)
 Robert Lindley (1776–1855)
 George Linley (1798–1865)
 Donald Mackay (died 1894)
 James Henry Mapleson (1802–1868)
 George Richard Metzler (1797–1867), dealer in instruments and publisher of music
 Nicolas Mori (1796–1839)
 George Perry (1793–1862)
 Philip Cipriani Hambly Potter (1792–1871)
 Joseph Richardson (c. 1790–1855)
 Sir Landon Ronald (1873–1938)
 Henry Russell (1812–1900)
 George Thomas Smart (1776–1867)
 Charles Edward Stephens (1821–1882)
 Steve Peregrine Took (né Porter) (1948–1980)
 William Vincent Wallace (1812–1865)
 Henry Wylde (1822–1890)

Photography

 Frederick Scott Archer (1814–1858)
 Alexander Bassano (1829–1913)
 William Bedford (1846–1893), brother of Francis and son of Francis Octavius Bedford
 (Robert) Vernon Heath (1820–1895)
 Oscar Rejlander (1813–1875)
 Charles Thurston Thompson (1816–1868), son of John Thompson

Politics

 Charles Arbuthnot (1767–1850)
 William Atherton (1806–1864)
 Sir Samuel George Bonham (1803–1863)
 Robert Bourke, Baron Connemara (1827–1902)
 George Bowen (1821–1899)
 Charles Buller (1806–1848)
 Montagu William Lowry Corry (Lord Rowton) (1838–1903)
 Charles Wentworth Dilke (1843–1911)
 Thomas Slingsby Duncombe (1796–1861)
 Sir Peter Hesketh-Fleetwood (1801–1866)
 John Hawley Glover (1829–1885)
 Sir Charles Edward Grey (1785–1865)
 George David Harris (1827–1902)
 Sir Edmund Walker Head (1805–1868)
 Henry Hetherington (1792–1849)
 John Cam Hobhouse (Baron Broughton de Gyfford) (1786–1869)
 Joseph Hume PC (1777–1855)
 George de Hochepied Larpent (1786–1855)
 Sir Richard Graves MacDonnell (1814–1881)
 Sir John Malcolm KCB (1769–1833)
 Sir William Molesworth, Bt (1810–1855)
 Lord Robert Montagu PC (1825–1902)
 John Lothrop Motley (1814–1877)
 Sir Patrick O'Brien 2nd Baron O'Brien (1823–1895)
 Feargus O'Connor (1794–1855)
 Sir William Gore Ouseley (1797–1866)
 Sir Arthur Paget GCB (1771–1840)
 Winthrop Mackworth Praed (1802–1839)
 Charles Ross (1799–1860)
 Charles Seale-Hayne (1833–1903)
 William Shaen (1820–1887)
 John Benjamin Smith (1794–1879)
 Sir James Stephen PC KCB (1789–1859)
 Charles Thompson (1st Lord Ritchie of Dundee) (1838–1906)
 Thomas Tooke (1774–1858)
 Charles Richard Vaughan (1775–1849)
 William Williams (1788–1865)
 Sir Charles George Young (1795–1869)

Religion

 William Brookfield (1809–1874)
 Rev. Adam Clarke (died 1886)
 Dr. John Clifford CH (1836–1923)
 John Cumming (1807–1881)
 Rev. Edward Chichester, 4th Marquess of Donegall (1799–1889)
 Rev. Sir Henry Robert Dukinfield, Bt (1791–1858)
 Robert Fellowes (1770–1847)
 James Fleming (1830–1908)
 Rev. Ridley Haim Herschell (1807–1864)
 Rev. David King (1806–1883)
 Robert Mackay (1803–1882)
 Rt. Rev. Thomas Musgrave (1778–1860)
 Samuel Rickards (1796–1865)
 Rev. Arthur Robins (1834–1899)
 Rev. George Shapcott (1848–1935)
 James Smirnove (1756–1840)
 Rev. Henry Stebbing FRS (1799–1883)
 Rt. Rev. Thomas Turton (1780–1864)

Royalty and aristocracy

 Mary Jane Adams, servant to Queens Victoria and Alexandra (1845–1921)
 Patrick Bowes-Lyon, (c. 1863–1946)
 Frances Bowles (née Temple), sister of Lord Palmerston (c. 1786–1838)
 George John Browne, 3rd Marquess of Sligo (1820–1896)
 Henry Ulick Browne, 5th Marquess of Sligo (1831–1913)
 Howe Peter Browne, 2nd Marquess of Sligo (1788–1845)
 Lady Anne Isabella Noel Byron (1792–1860)
 George William Frederick Charles, Duke of Cambridge (1819–1904)
 Marigold Frances Churchill (1918–1921), daughter of Sir Winston Churchill
 Sir George Couper Bt (1788–1861)
 John Constantine De Courcy, Baron Kingsale (1827–1865), Premier Baron of Ireland
 Jind Kaur (1817–1863), wife of Ranjit Singh, mother of deposed maharaja Duleep Singh
 Percy Sholto Douglas, 10th Marquess of Queensberry (1868–1920), brother of 'Bosie'
 Duchess of Inverness (Cecilia Letitia Underwood) (1793–1873), morganatic wife of the Duke of Sussex
 Victoria Paget, god-daughter of Queen Victoria (1848–1859)
 Baron Georg Friedrich Wilhelm von Pfeilitzer genannt Franck (1767–1853)
 William John Cavendish Scott-Bentinck, 5th Duke of Portland (1800–1879)
 Edward Adolphus Seymour KG FRS, 11th Duke of Somerset (1775–1853)
 George Augustus Frederick Percy Sydney Smythe, 7th Viscount Strangford (1818–1857), nephew of the Duke of Wellington
 Lord Granville Charles Henry Somerset (1792–1848)
 Princess Sophia (1777–1848), fifth daughter of George III
 Charles James Stewart (1775–1839)
 Augustus Frederick, Duke of Sussex (1773–1843), sixth son of George III
 Mary Ann Thurston, nurse to the children of Queen Victoria (1810–1896)

Scientists

 Charles Babbage FRS (1791–1871)
 George Bishop (1785–1861)
 Rev. John Frederick Blake (1839–1906)
 William John Broderip FRS (1789–1859)
 Robert Brown FRS (1773–1858)
 Samuel Hawksley Burbury FRS (1831–1911)
 George Busk FRS (1807–1886)
 Sir Samuel Canning (1823–1908)
 Hugh Cuming (1791–1865)
 William Freeman Daniell (1818–1865)
 Henry De la Beche FRS (1796–1855)
 Edward John Dent (1790–1853)
 Alexander John Ellis FRS (1814–1890)
 Hugh Falconer FRS (1808–1865)
 David Forbes FRS (1828–1876)
 Sir Thomas Galloway FRS (1796–1851)
 John Hall Gladstone FRS (1827–1902)
 Joseph Glynn FRS (1799–1863)
 John Gould FRS  (1804–1881)
 George Bellas Greenough FRS (1778–1855)
 Sir William Robert Grove FRS (1811–1896)
 Edmond Herbert Grove-Hills FRS (1864–1922)
 Frederick Gully (1833–1866)
 Thomas Hancock (1786–1865)
 Henry Noel Humphreys (1810–1879)
 William Kidd (1803–1867)
 Charles Konig (1774–1851)
 John Claudius Loudon (1783–1843)
 Robert James Mann (1817–1886)
 Robert Marnock (1800–1889)
 Augustus Matthieson (1831–1870)
 Frank McClean FRS (1837–1904)
 Rudolph Messel (1848–1920)
 John Morris  (1810–1886)
 George Newport FRS (1803–1854)
 Sir Charles Thomas Newton (1816–1886)
 Frederick Edward Pirkis (1835–1910)
 Baden Powell FRS (1796–1860)
 Joseph Sabine FRS (1770–1837)
 George James Symons FRS (1838–1900)
 Edward Troughton FRS (1753–1835)
 Edward Turner FRS (1798–1837)
 Nathaniel Wallich FRS (1786–1854)
 Friedrich Welwitsch (1806–1872)
 Sir Charles Wheatstone FRS (1802–1875)
 Frederick Albert Winsor (1763–1830)
 James Wyld (1812–1887)

Sport

 Henry Charles Angelo the Younger (1780–1852)
 James Cobbett (1804–1842), cricketer
 Edmund Carter Daniels (1857–1885)
 Percival May Davson (c. 1876–1959), fencer and tennis player
 Louis Charles de la Bourdonnais (1795–1840), chess master
 Robert David Diamond (1896–1972)
 Henry Jones (1831–1899)
 Imré Kiralfry (1845–1919)
 Roger Kynaston (1805–1874)
 Alexander McDonnell (1798–1835), chess master
 James Prince (died 1886)
 Prince Dimitry Soltykoff (c. 1827–1903), racehorse owner
 Howard Staunton (1810–1874)
 Allan Gibson Steel (1858–1914)
 Owen Swift (1814–1879)
 Major Walter Clopton Wingfield (1833–1912)

Theatre

 James Albery (1838–1889)
 James Robertson Anderson (1811–1895)
 Hezekiah Linthicum Bateman (1812–1875)
 Henry Roxby Beverley (1790–1863)
 Henry Roxby Beverley (c. 1814–1889)
 John Boaden (1762–1839)
 Arthur Bourchier (1863–1927)
 Anna Maria Bradshaw (1801–1862)
 John Braham (1774–1856)
 Agnes Butterfield (Kitty Melrose) (1883–1912)
 Oscar Byrn (1795–1867)
 Ada Cavendish (Marshal) (1839–1895)
 George Claremont (1846–1919)
 "Handsome" Harry Clifton (c. 1826–1872)
 Samuel Collins (Samuel Vagg) (1825–1865)
 Benjamin Conquest né Benjamin Oliver (c. 1804–1872)
 John Cooper (c. 1793–1880)
 William Creswick (1813–1888)
 George Danson (1799–1881)
 Sir William Henry Don (1825–1862)
 John Ebers (1778–1858)
 Willie Edouin (William Frederick Bryer) (1846–1908)
 Sarah Louisa Fairbrother (1816–1890), wife of the Duke of Cambridge
 Richard Flexmore (1824–1860)
 Lydia Alice Foote (Legge) (1844–1892)
 Isabella Glyn (Dallas) (1823–1889)
 George Grossmith (1847–1912)
 John Pritt ('Fat Jack') Harley (1786–1858)
 Robb Harwood (c. 1870–1910)
 Catherine Hayes (1818–1861)
 Henry Holl (1811–1884)
 Charles Philip Kemble (1775–1854)
 Frances Anne Kemble (1809–1893)
 Frederick Lablache (1815–1887)
 Sarah Lane (1822–1899)
 Carlotta Le Clercq (1840–1893)
 Rose Le Clercq (1845–1899)
 Alfred Leslie (né Lester) (1874–1925)
 John Liston (1776–1864)
 William Edward Love (1806–1867)
 William Charles Macready (1793–1873)
 Florence Marryat (1838–1899)
 Charles James Mathews (1803–1878)
 Elizabeth Mathews (Lizzy Davenport) (1806–1899)
 Horace Mayhew (1816–1872)
 John Maddison Morton (1811–1891)
 Rosoman Mountain (c. 1768–1841)
 Ellen Amelia Orridge (1856–1883)
 Harold Pinter (1930–2008)
 Sir Terence Mervyn Rattigan (1911–1979)
 Robert Reece (1838–1891)
 Robert Roxby (1817–1866)
 Henry Russell (1812–1900)
 Charles Selby (born George Harvey Wilson) (1802–1863)
 Catherine Stephens, Countess of Essex (1794–1882)
 George Tyrrell Thorne (1856–1922)
 Theresa Catherine Johanna Tietjens (1831–1877)
 William Harries Tilbury (1806–1884)
 John Lawrence Toole (1830–1906)
 Lucia Elizabeth Vestris (1797–1836)
 Clara Vestris Webster (1821–1844)
 Alfred Sydney Wigan (1814–1878)
 John Wilson (1800–1849)
 Lewis Strange Wingfield (1842–1891)

Writing

 William Harrison Ainsworth (1805–1882)
 Henry Spencer Ashbee (1834–1900)
 George Percy Badger (1815–1888)
 Rev. Richard Harris Barham (1788–1845)
 Thomas Barnes (1785–1841)
 Robert Bell (1800–1867)
 James Boaden (1762–1839)
 Charles William Shirley Brooks (1816–1874)
 John Bruce (1802–1869)
 Maria Calcott (1785–1842)
 John Cassell (1817–1865)
 John Hobart Caunter (1792–1851)
 Frederic Chapman (1823–1895)
 Henry Colburn (died 1855)
 William Wilkie Collins (1824–1889)
 Edward Herbert Cooper (1867–1910)
 Walter Coulson (1794–1860)
 Eyre Evans Crowe (1799–1868)
 Sir Joseph Archer Crowe (1825–1896)
 George Darley (1795–1846)
 Robert Deverell (né Pedley) (1760–1841)
 Rev. Thomas Frognall Dibdin (1776–1847)
 Charles Wentworth Dilke (1789–1864)
 George Dyer (1755–1841)
 Lady Elizabeth Eastlake (1809–1893)
 John Passmore Edwards (1823–1911)
 Giovanni Battista ('Tita') Falcieri (1798–1874)
 John Forster (1812–1876)
 Joseph Foster (1844–1905)
 Augustus Wollaston Franks (1826–1897)
 Erich Fried (1921–1988)
 Elias John Wilkinson Gibb (1857–1901)
 Alexander Gilchrist (1828–1861)
 Catherine Grace Frances Gore (1799–1861)
 Thomas Colley Grattan (1792–1864)
 Barnard Gregory (1796–1852)
 Sophia Peabody Hawthorne (1809–1871) and Una Hawthorne (1844–1877) (Remains moved to Concord, Massachusetts, in 2006.)
 Edward Peron Hingston (c. 1823–1876)
 Shadworth Holloway Hodgson (1832–1912)
 George Hogarth (1783–1870)
 Mary Scott Hogarth (1819–1837)
 Jane Hogg (1798–1837)
 Thomas Jefferson Hogg (1792–1862)
 Lady Saba Holland (died 1866)
 Thomas Hood (1798–1845)
 James Henry Leigh Hunt (1784–1859)
 John Winter Jones (1805–1881)
 William Martin Leake (1777–1860)
 Augusta Leigh (1784–1851)
 Thomas Henry Lister (1801–1842)
 Charlotte Sophia Lockhart (née Scott) (c. 1800–1837)
 Jane Wells Loudon (1807–1858)
 Samuel Lover (1797–1868)
 Frances Dunlop Lowell (1825–1885)
 John MacCreery (1768–1832)
 Charles Mackay (1814–1889)
 Frederick Madden (1801–1873)
 Henry Mayhew (1812–1887)
 John Murray (1778–1843)
 John Bowyer Nichols (1779–1863)
 John Francis O'Donnell (1837–1874)
 James Ripley Osgood (1836–1892)
 Julia Pardoe (1804–1862)
 William Pickering (1796–1854)
 Catherine Louisa Pirkis (1841–1910)
 James Pope-Hennessy (1916–1974)
 Emil Reich (1854–1910)
 Thomas Mayne Reid (1818–1883)
 William Caldwell Roscoe (1823–1859)
 Frederick August Rosen (1805–1837)
 Edmund Routledge (1843–1899)
 Anne Scott (1803–1833)
 Henry Silver (1828–1910)
 Rev. Sydney Smith (1771–1845)
 Harriet Marian Minny Stephen (née Thackeray) (1840–1875)
 Benjamin Franklin Stevens (1833–1902)
 Tibor Szamuely (1925–1972)
 William Makepeace Thackeray (1811–1863)
 William Tooke (1777–1863)
 Anthony Trollope (1815–1882)
 Andrew White Tuer (1838–1900)
 Samuel Waddington (1844–1923)
 John Wade (1788–1875)
 John Weale (1791–1862)
 Charles Whittingham (1795–1876)
 Lady Jane Francesca Wilde ('Speranza', Oscar Wilde's mother) (1821–1896)
 Horace Hayman Wilson (1786–1860)
 Bernard Bolingbroke Woodward (1816–1869)

Others

 Sir George Birkbeck (1776–1841)
 Sir Claude Robert Campbell (1871–1900)
 Lord Thomas Cecil (1797–1873)
 Sophie Dawes, Baronne de Feuchères (c. 1792–1840)
 Joshua Girling Fitch (1824–1903)
 Ann Foster (1827–1882) née Orchard and also Dinham and Riddiford.  Former Australian convict.
 Angelica Patience Fraser (1823–1910)
 Henry Weysford Charles Hastings (4th Marquess of Hastings) (1842–1868)
 Robert Hibbert (1769–1849)
 Baron Gunther Rau von Holzhauzen (1882–1905)
 Joseph Hudson, tobacconist (1778–1854)
 Andargachew Messai (1902–1981)
 William Pole-Tylney-Long-Wellesley, 4th Earl of Mornington (1788–1857)
 Kate Meyrick (1875–1933)
 George Payne (1803–1878)
 Walter Peart (died 1898), engine driver killed in an accident
 David Ochterlony Dyce Sombre (1808–1851)
 Alexis Benoit Soyer (1809–1858)
 Dwarkanath Tagore (1794–1856)
 Louisa Twining (1820–1912)
 Louis Eustache Ude (1768–1846)
 Richard Valpy (1754–1836)
 Kaye Webb (1914–1996), editor and publisher

References

External links
 

Cemeteries in London
Kensal Green Cemetery